Pan Twardowski is a 1936 Polish fantasy film directed by Henryk Szaro and starring Franciszek Brodniewicz, Kazimierz Junosza-Stępowski and Maria Bogda. It is one of many films based on the legend of Pan Twardowski who makes a Faustian pact to win the love of a woman.

Main cast
Franciszek Brodniewicz as Pan Twardowski
Kazimierz Junosza-Stępowski as Satan
Maria Bogda as Kasia
Elżbieta Barszczewska as Neta / Pani Twardowska
Mieczysława Ćwiklińska as Neta's Aunt
Maria Malicka as Twardowski's Mother
Zofia Lindorf as Queen Barbara Radziwiłłówna
Józef Węgrzyn as King Zygmunt II August
Jan Kurnakowicz as Maciek
Stefan Jaracz as Master Maciej, Alchemist
Bogusław Samborski as Neta's Fiancé
Stanisław Sielański as Servant
Tadeusz Wesołowski as Man in Court
Michał Znicz as Judge
 Loda Niemirzanka as Wedding Guest (uncredited)

Bibliography
Skaff, Sheila. The Law of the Looking Glass: Cinema in Poland, 1896–1939. Ohio University Press, 2008.

References

External links

1936 films
1930s fantasy films
Polish fantasy films
1930s Polish-language films
Polish black-and-white films
Films directed by Henryk Szaro